Psalidopus is a genus of shrimp placed in its own family, Psalidopodidae, and superfamily, Psalidopodoidea. It comprises three species, one in the western Atlantic Ocean, and two in the Indo-Pacific.

Psalidopus barbouri
P. barbouri occurs on continental and insular slopes from Florida, the Bahamas and the Gulf of Mexico, to parts of the Caribbean Sea, perhaps extending as far south as Suriname.

Psalidopus huxleyi
P. huxleyi occurs on continental and insular slopes across the Indian Ocean, including the Laccadive Sea, off southern India, the Andaman Sea and the Timor Sea, as well as in the western Pacific Ocean from southern Japan to the Philippines, the Sulu Sea, and the Celebes Sea.

Psalidopus tosaensis
P. tosaensis lives at greater depth ( 2800 m) and lower temperature –  – than either of the other species of Psalidopus. Although it is geographically closer to P. huxleyi, it appears to be more closely related to P. barbouri.

References

Caridea
Taxa named by James Wood-Mason